Ignatius of Antioch (Greek: Ἰγνάτιος Ἀντιοχείας, Ignátios Antiokheías; died c. 108/140 AD), also known as Ignatius Theophorus (Ignátios ho Theophóros, lit. "the God-bearing"), was an early Christian writer and Patriarch of Antioch. While en route to Rome, where he met his martyrdom, Ignatius wrote a series of letters. This correspondence now forms a central part of a later collection of works known to be authored by the Apostolic Fathers. He is considered to be one of the three most important of these, together with Clement of Rome and Polycarp. His letters also serve as an example of early Christian theology. Important topics they address include ecclesiology, the sacraments, and the role of bishops.

Life 

Nothing is known of Ignatius' life apart from what may be inferred internally from his letters, except from later (sometimes spurious) traditions. It is said Ignatius converted to Christianity at a young age. Tradition identifies Ignatius, along with his friend Polycarp, as disciples of John the Apostle. Later in his life, Ignatius was chosen to serve as Bishop of Antioch; the fourth-century Church historian Eusebius writes that Ignatius succeeded Evodius. Theodoret of Cyrrhus claimed that St. Peter himself left directions that Ignatius be appointed to the episcopal see of Antioch. Ignatius called himself Theophorus (God Bearer). A tradition arose that he was one of the children whom Jesus Christ took in his arms and blessed.

Veneration 
Ignatius' feast day was kept in his own Antioch on 17 October, the day on which he is now celebrated in the Catholic Church and generally in western Christianity, although from the 12th century until 1969 it was put at 1 February in the General Roman Calendar.

In the Eastern Orthodox Church it is observed on 20 December. The Synaxarium of the Coptic Orthodox Church of Alexandria places it on the 24th of the Coptic Month of Koiak (which is also the 24th day of the fourth month of Tahisas in the Synaxarium of The Ethiopian Orthodox Tewahedo Church), corresponding in three years out of every four to 20 December in the Julian Calendar, which currently falls on 2 January of the Gregorian Calendar.

Ignatius is honored in the Church of England and in the Episcopal Church on 17 October.

Martyrdom

Circumstances of martyrdom 
Instead of being executed in his home town of Antioch, Ignatius was escorted to Rome by a company of ten Roman soldiers:

Scholars consider Ignatius' transport to Rome unusual, since those persecuted as Christians would be expected to be punished locally. Stevan Davies has pointed out that "no other examples exist from the Flavian age of any prisoners except citizens or prisoners of war being brought to Rome for execution."

If Ignatius had been a Roman citizen, he could have appealed to the emperor, but then he would usually have been beheaded rather than tortured. Furthermore, the epistles of Ignatius state that he was put in chains during the journey to Rome, but it was illegal under Roman law for a citizen to be put in bonds during an appeal to the emperor.

Allen Brent argues that Ignatius was transferred to Rome at the request of the emperor in order to provide entertainment to the masses by being killed in the Colosseum. Brent insists, contrary to some, that "it was normal practice to transport condemned criminals from the provinces in order to offer spectator sport in the Colosseum at Rome."

Stevan Davies rejects the idea that Ignatius was transported to Rome for the games at the Colosseum. He reasons that "if Ignatius was in some way a donation by the Imperial Governor of Syria to the games at Rome, a single prisoner seems a rather miserly gift." Instead, Davies proposes that Ignatius may have been indicted by a legate, or representative, of the governor of Syria while the governor was away temporarily, and sent to Rome for trial and execution. Under Roman law, only the governor of a province or the emperor himself could impose capital punishment, so the legate would have faced the choice of imprisoning Ignatius in Antioch or sending him to Rome. Davies postulates that the legate may have decided to send Ignatius to Rome so as to minimize any further dissension among the Antiochene Christians.

Christine Trevett has called Davies' suggestion "entirely hypothetical" and concludes that no fully satisfactory solution to the problem can be found, writing, "I tend to take the bishop at his word when he says he is a condemned man. But the question remains, why is he going to Rome? The truth is that we do not know."

Route of travel to Rome 
During the journey to Rome, Ignatius and his entourage of soldiers made a number of lengthy stops in Asia Minor, deviating from the most direct land route from Antioch to Rome. Scholars generally agree on the following reconstruction of Ignatius' route of travel:
 Ignatius first traveled from Antioch, in the province of Syria, to Asia Minor. It is uncertain whether he traveled by sea or by land.
 He was then taken to Smyrna, via a route that bypassed the cities of Magnesia, Tralles, and Ephesus, but likely passed through Philadelphia (cf. Ign. Phil. 7).
 Ignatius then traveled to Troas, where he boarded a ship bound for Neapolis in Macedonia (cf. Ign. Pol. 8).
 He then passed through the city of Philippi (cf. Pol. Phil. 9).
 After this, he took some land or sea route to Rome.
During the journey, the soldiers seem to have allowed Ignatius to meet with entire congregations of Christians while in chains, at least while he was in Philadelphia (cf. Ign. Phil. 7), and numerous Christian visitors and messengers were allowed to meet with him on a one-on-one basis. These messengers allowed Ignatius to send six letters to nearby churches, and one to Polycarp, the bishop of Smyrna.

These aspects of Ignatius' martyrdom are also regarded by scholars as unusual. It is generally expected that a prisoner would be transported on the most direct, cost-effective route to their destination. Since travel by land in the Roman Empire was between five and fifty-two times more expensive than travel by sea, and Antioch was a major port city, the most efficient route would likely have been entirely by sea. Steven Davies argues that Ignatius' circuitous route to Rome can only be explained by positing that he was not the main purpose of the soldiers' trip, and that the various stops in Asia Minor were for other state business. He suggests that such a scenario would also explain the relative freedom that Ignatius was given to meet with other Christians during the journey.

Date of martyrdom 
Due to the sparse and fragmentary nature of the documentation of Ignatius' life and martyrdom, the date of his death is subject to a significant amount of uncertainty. Tradition places the martyrdom of Ignatius in the reign of Trajan, who was emperor of Rome from 98 to 117 AD. The earliest source for this Trajanic date is the 4th century church historian Eusebius of Caesarea, who is regarded by some modern scholars as an unreliable source for chronological information regarding the early church. It has been argued that Eusebius had an ideological interest in dating church leaders as early as possible, and ensuring that there were no gaps in succession between the original apostles of Jesus and the leaders of the church in his day.

While many scholars accept the traditional dating of Ignatius' martyrdom under Trajan, others have argued for a somewhat later date. Richard Pervo dated Ignatius' death to 135–140 AD. British classicist Timothy Barnes has argued for a date in the 140s AD, on the grounds that Ignatius seems to have quoted a work of the Gnostic Ptolemy in one of his epistles, who only became active in the 130s. Étienne Decrept has argued on the basis of the witnesses of John Malalas and the Acts of Drosis that Ignatius, along with other Christians, was martyred under the reign of Trajan, but during Apollo's festival in July 116 AD and in response to the earthquake that had struck Antioch at the end of 115 AD.

Death and aftermath 
Ignatius himself wrote that he would be thrown to the beasts, and in the fourth century Eusebius reports tradition that this came to pass, which is then repeated by Jerome who is the first to explicitly mention "lions." John Chrysostom is the first to allude to the Colosseum as the place of Ignatius' martyrdom. Contemporary scholars are uncertain that any of these authors had sources other than Ignatius' own writings.

According to a medieval Christian text titled Martyrium Ignatii, Ignatius' remains were carried back to Antioch by his companions after his martyrdom. The sixth-century writings of Evagrius Scholasticus state that the reputed remains of Ignatius were moved by the Emperor Theodosius II to the Tychaeum, or Temple of Tyche, which had been converted into a church dedicated to Ignatius. In 637, when Antioch was captured by the Rashidun Caliphate, the relics were transferred to the Basilica di San Clemente in Rome.

The Martyrium Ignatii
There is a purported eye-witness account of his martyrdom, named the Martyrium Ignatii. It is presented as being an eye-witness account for the church of Antioch, attributed to Ignatius' companions, Philo of Cilicia, deacon at Tarsus, and Rheus Agathopus, a Syrian.

Its most reliable manuscript is the 10th-century Codex Colbertinus (Paris), in which the Martyrium closes the collection. The Martyrium presents the confrontation of the bishop Ignatius with Trajan at Antioch, a familiar trope of Acta of the martyrs, and many details of the long, partly overland voyage to Rome. The Synaxarium of the Coptic Orthodox Church of Alexandria says that he was thrown to the wild beasts that devoured him and rent him to pieces.

Epistles 

The following seven epistles preserved under the name of Ignatius are generally considered authentic, since they were mentioned by the historian Eusebius in the first half of the fourth century.

Seven original epistles:
 The Epistle to the Ephesians,
 The Epistle to the Magnesians,
 The Epistle to the Trallians,
 The Epistle to the Romans,
 The Epistle to the Philadelphians,
 The Epistle to the Smyrnaeans,
 The Epistle to Polycarp, a bishop of Smyrna.

Recensions 
The text of these epistles is known in three different recensions, or editions: the Short Recension, found in a Syriac manuscript; the Middle Recension, found only in Greek manuscripts; and the Long Recension, found in Greek and Latin manuscripts.

For some time, it was believed that the Long Recension was the only extant version of the Ignatian epistles, but around 1628 a Latin translation of the Middle Recension was discovered by Archbishop James Ussher, who published it in 1646. For around a quarter of a century after this, it was debated which recension represented the original text of the epistles. But ever since John Pearson's strong defense of the authenticity of the Middle Recension in the late 17th century, there has been a scholarly consensus that the Middle Recension is the original version of the text. The Long Recension is the product of a fourth-century Arian Christian, who interpolated the Middle Recension epistles in order posthumously to enlist Ignatius as an unwitting witness in theological disputes of that age.

Manuscripts representing the Short Recension of the Ignatian epistles were discovered and published by William Cureton in the mid-19th century. For a brief period, there was a scholarly debate on the question of whether the Short Recension was earlier and more original than the Middle Recension. But by the end of the 19th century, Theodor Zahn and J. B. Lightfoot had established a scholarly consensus that the Short Recension is merely a summary of the text of the Middle Recension, and was therefore composed later.

Authenticity 
Ever since the Protestant Reformation in the 16th century, the authenticity of all the Ignatian epistles has come under intense scrutiny. John Calvin called the epistles "rubbish published under Ignatius’ name." Some Protestants have tended to want to deny the authenticity of all the epistles attributed to Ignatius because they seem to attest to the existence of a monarchical episcopate in the second century. The Catholic Church has long held up the authenticity of the letters from past to present.

In 1886, Presbyterian minister and church historian William Dool Killen published an essay extensively arguing that none of the epistles attributed to Ignatius were authentic. Instead, he argued that Callixtus, bishop of Rome, forged the letters around AD 220 to garner support for a monarchical episcopate, modeling the renowned Saint Ignatius after his own life to give precedent for his own authority. Killen contrasted this episcopal polity with the presbyterian polity in the writings of Polycarp.

Some doubts about the authenticity of the original letters continued into the 20th century. In the late 1970s and 1980s, the scholars Robert Joly, Reinhard Hübner, Markus Vinzent, and Thomas Lechner argued forcefully that the epistles of the Middle Recension were forgeries written during the reign of Marcus Aurelius (161–180 AD). Around the same time, the scholar Joseph Ruis-Camps published a study arguing that the Middle Recension letters were pseudepigraphically composed based on an original, smaller, authentic corpus of four letters (Romans, Magnesians, Trallians, and Ephesians). In 2009, Otto Zwierlein took up the thesis of a fake, made around 170.

These publications stirred up tremendous, heated controversy in the scholarly community at the time, but in 2017, most patristic scholars accepted the authenticity of the seven original epistles. However, J. Lookadoo said in 2020 that "the debate has received renewed energy since the late 1990s and shows few signs of slowing."

The original texts of six of the seven original letters are found in the Codex Mediceo Laurentianus written in Greek in the 11th century (which also contains the pseudepigraphical letters of the Long Recension, except that to the Philippians), while the letter to the Romans is found in the Codex Colbertinus.

Style and structure 
Ignatius's letters bear signs of being written in great haste and without a proper plan, such as run-on sentences and an unsystematic succession of thought. Ignatius modelled his writings after those written by (or attributed to) Paul, Peter, and John, and even quoted or paraphrased biblical entries by these apostles' works freely, such as when he quoted 1 Corinthians 1:18, in his letter to the Ephesians:

Theology

Christology 
Ignatius is known to have taught the deity of Christ: 
The same section in text of the Long Recension says the following:

He stressed the value of the Eucharist, calling it a "medicine of immortality" (Ignatius to the Ephesians 20:2). The very strong desire for bloody martyrdom in the arena, which Ignatius expresses rather graphically in places, may seem quite odd to the modern reader. An examination of his theology of soteriology shows that he regarded salvation as one being free from the powerful fear of death and thus to face martyrdom bravely.

Ignatius is claimed to be the first known Christian writer to argue in favor of Christianity's replacement of the Sabbath with the Lord's Day:

This passage has provoked textual debate since the only Greek manuscript extant read Κατα κυριακήν ζωήν ζωντες which could be translated "living according to the Lord's life." Most scholars, however, have followed the Latin text (secundum dominicam) omitting ζωήν and translating "living according to Lord's Day".

Ecclesiology 
Ignatius is the earliest known Christian writer to emphasize loyalty to a single bishop in each city (or diocese) who is assisted by both presbyters (priests) and deacons. Earlier writings only mention  bishops  presbyters.

For instance, his writings on bishops, presbyters and deacons:

He is also responsible for the first known use of the Greek word katholikos (καθολικός), or catholic, meaning "universal", "complete" and "whole" to describe the Church, writing:

Joseph Lightfoot states the word "catholic (καθόλου)" simply means "universal" and can be found not only before and after Ignatius amongst ecclesiastical and classical writers, but centuries before the Christian era. Ignatius of Antioch is also attributed the earliest recorded use of the term "Christianity"  AD.

Parallels with Peregrinus Proteus 
Several scholars have noted that there are striking similarities between Ignatius and the Christian-turned-Cynic philosopher Peregrinus Proteus, as described in Lucian's famous satire The Passing of Peregrinus:
 Both Ignatius and Peregrinus show a morbid eagerness to die.
 Both characters are, or have been, Christians.
 Both are imprisoned by Roman authorities.
 Upon the arrest of both prisoners, Christians from all over Asia Minor come to visit them and bring them gifts (cf. Peregr. 12–13).
 Both prisoners sent letters to several Greek cities shortly before their deaths as "testaments, counsels, and laws", appointing "couriers" and "ambassadors" for the purpose.
It is generally believed that these parallels are the result of Lucian intentionally copying traits from Ignatius and applying them to his satire of Peregrinus. If the dependence of Lucian on the Ignatian epistles is accepted, then this places an upper limit on the date of the epistles: around the 160s AD, just before The Passing of Peregrinus was written.

In 1892, Daniel Völter sought to explain the parallels by proposing that the Ignatian epistles were in fact written by Peregrinus, and later edited to conceal their provenance, but this speculative theory has failed to make a significant impact on the academic community.

Pseudo-Ignatius 
Epistles attributed to Saint Ignatius but of spurious origin (their author is often called Pseudo-Ignatius in English) include:
 Epistle to the Tarsians
 Epistle to the Antiochians
 Epistle to Hero, a Deacon of Antioch
 Epistle to the Philippians
 The Epistle of Maria the Proselyte to Ignatius
 Epistle to Mary at Neapolis, Zarbus
 First Epistle to St. John
 Second Epistle to St. John
 The Epistle of Ignatius to the Virgin Mary

See also 

 Apostolic succession
 Christianity in the 1st century
 Christianity in the 2nd century
 Early centers of Christianity
 List of Patriarchs of Antioch
 Saint Ignatius of Antioch, patron saint archive
 Apostolic Fathers
 Catholicity
 Ignatius of Loyola

References

Citations

Sources

Further reading

External links 

 
 
 Early Christian writings: On-line texts of St. Ignatius' letters (archived) (non-archived link)
 The Ecclesiology of St. Ignatius of Antioch by Fr. John S. Romanides
 Saint Ignatius
 Opera Omnia by J.-P. Migne, Patrologia Graeca with analytical indexes
 Catholic Encyclopedia: Spurious Epistles of St. Ignatius of Antioch
 Ignatius writings in the Ante-Nicene Fathers
 Greek text of Ignatius writings
 2012 Translation & Audio Version (Authentic Seven Letters and Martyrdom of Ignatius)
 Saint Ignatius of Antioch at the  Christian Iconography web site
 Here Followeth the Life of St. Ignatius, Bishop from Caxton's translation of the Golden Legend
 Colonnade Statue in St Peter's Square
 
 

30s births
100s deaths
Converts to Christianity from pagan religions
Church Fathers
Patriarchs of Antioch
Saints from Roman Syria
1st-century archbishops
Syrian archbishops
2nd-century archbishops
2nd-century Christian theologians
2nd-century Christian martyrs
People executed by the Roman Empire
2nd-century executions
Burials at San Clemente al Laterano
Anglican saints